Dicheniotes angulicornis is a species of tephritid or fruit flies in the genus Dicheniotes of the family Tephritidae.

Distribution
Sudan.

References

Tephritinae
Insects described in 1931
Diptera of Africa